Nazim-e-Multan is the Mayor who heads the Municipal Corporation Multan (MCM) which controls the Local Government system of Multan, Pakistan.

Multan local government system 
There are 68 Union Councils in Municipal Corporation Multan (MCM), the body which controls local government of Multan.The Union Councils elect their Chairmen and Vice Chairmen who then elect their Mayor and Deputy Mayor respectively.

List of mayors 
Following is the list of Mayors of Multan in recent time

Local Government elections 2015 

Local government election held in Multan on December 5, 2015

The mayor and Deputy Mayors of Multan have been delayed.

See also 

 Mayor of Faisalabad
 Mayor of Lahore
 Mayor of Rawalpindi

References 

Lists of mayors
Mayors, Multan